MADD or Madd may refer to:
 Mothers Against Drunk Driving, a nonprofit organization in the United States and Canada that seeks to stop drunk driving
 Myoadenylate deaminase deficiency or Adenosine monophosphate deaminase deficiency type 1, a metabolic disorder
 Multiple acyl-CoA dehydrogenase deficiency, another name for the genetic disorder Glutaric acidemia type 2
 MADD (gene) or MAP kinase-activating death domain protein
 Madd, the fruit of Saba senegalensis
 Maladaptive Daydreaming Disorder (written MaDD)